Esteve Tomas Roca (born 25 March 1957) is an Andorran alpine skier. He competed in the men's giant slalom at the 1976 Winter Olympics.

Notes

References

External links
 
 
 

1957 births
Living people
Andorran male alpine skiers
Olympic alpine skiers of Andorra
Alpine skiers at the 1976 Winter Olympics